The International Day for the Remembrance of the Slave Trade and its Abolition is an international day celebrated August 23 of each year, the day designated by UNESCO to memorialize the transatlantic slave trade.

That date was chosen by the adoption of resolution 29 C/40 by the Organization's General Conference at its 29th session. Circular CL/3494 of July 29, 1998, from the Director-General invited Ministers of Culture to promote the day. The date is significant because, during the night of August 22 to August 23, 1791, on the island of Saint Domingue (now known as Haiti), an uprising began which set forth events which were a major factor in the abolition of the transatlantic slave trade.

UNESCO Member States organize events every year on that date, inviting  participation from young people, educators, artists and intellectuals. As part of the goals of the intercultural UNESCO project, "The Slave Route", it is an opportunity for collective recognition and focus on the "historic causes, the methods and the consequences" of slavery. Additionally, it sets the stage for analysis and dialogue of the interactions which gave rise to the transatlantic trade in human beings between Africa, Europe, the Americas and the Caribbean.

Activity within different nations
The International Day for the Remembrance of the Slave Trade and its Abolition was first celebrated in a number of countries, in particular in Haiti on August 23, 1998, and Senegal on August 23, 1999. A number of cultural events and debates were organized.

France
In 2001 the Museum of Printed Textiles (Musée de l'impression sur étoffes) in Mulhouse, France, conducted a fabric workshop entitled "Indiennes de Traite" (a type of calico) used as currency in trade for Africans.

United Kingdom

Liverpool
National Museums Liverpool and the black community in Liverpool have held events to commemorate Slavery Remembrance Day since 1999. The Liverpool Slavery Remembrance Initiative – a partnership between National Museums Liverpool, individuals from the Liverpool Black community, Liverpool City Council, Liverpool Culture Company and The Mersey Partnership – was founded in 2006 to lead on the organisation of the event. The International Slavery Museum in Liverpool opened its doors on August 23, 2007.
The Walk of Remembrance through the city began in 2011, which has been led by Dr Gee Walker since 2013. The route passes the site of Old Dock where slave ships were moored and been repaired, and finishes at the Dr Martin Luther King Jr Building where it is closed by a Libation ceremony at Albert Dock.

London
The inaugural Slavery Remembrance National Memorial Service will be held on 21 August 2016 in Trafalgar Square. 
The National Maritime Museum in Greenwich hosts an annual commemoration event on 23 August which closes with a silent ceremony on the banks of the river Thames.

Other international observances
Other comparable international observances include: 
 International Day of Commemoration in Memory of the Victims of the Holocaust - 27 January
 International Day for the Elimination of Racial Discrimination - 21 March
 International Day of Remembrance of the Victims of Slavery and the Transatlantic Slave Trade - 25 March 
 International Day for Tolerance - 16 November
 International Day for the Abolition of Slavery - 2 December 
and: 
 the International Year to Commemorate the Struggle against Slavery and its Abolition in 2004
 the International Year for People of African Descent in 2011
 the International Decade for People of African Descent 2015-2024

References

External links
2021 Theme: “Ending Slavery’s Legacy of Racism: A Global Imperative for Justice” UN observances
 23 August: International Day for the Remembrance of the Slave Trade and its Abolition
 Slavery Remembrance National Memorial Service 2016, London
 International Slavery Remembrance Day, National Maritime Museum, Greenwich, London

UNESCO
International observances
African slave trade
Abolitionism
United Nations days
August observances
Remembrance days